The 2020 Champion Hurdle was a horse race held at Cheltenham Racecourse on Tuesday 10 March 2021. It was the 90th running of the Champion Hurdle.

The race was won by the 2/1 favourite Epatante, ridden by Barry Geraghty and trained by Nicky Henderson.

Race details
 Sponsor: Unibet
 Purse: 
 Going:Soft
 Distance:2 miles 87 yards
 Number of runners: 17
 Winner's time: 4:07.03

References

External links
2020 Champion Hurdle at the Racing Post

Champion Hurdle
2020
Champion Hurdle
2020s in Gloucestershire
Champion Hurdle